Davina Smith (born 1982) is an Australian journalist and news presenter.

Smith currently presents Nine Morning News, Nine Afternoon News and is news presenter on the Nine Network's Today Extra.

Career
Smith attended St Ursula's College in Toowoomba before studying at the University of Southern Queensland.

In 2002, Smith did work experience in Brisbane's Nine newsroom. That led to a job with Nine's then-regional affiliate WIN News, working as a reporter and presenter in Rockhampton, Toowoomba and the Sunshine Coast.

Smith has also been a relief weather presenter for WIN Television, filling in for Peter Byrne on the various local editions of WIN News in Queensland.

In 2011, Smith moved to the Nine Network in Brisbane, to help fill the void left by the sackings of two journalists and a news producer over the network's "Choppergate" scandal. She primarily presented the weather on weekends, but also filled in as the main presenter whenever required, including when Eva Milic went on maternity leave in 2012.

In February 2014, Smith moved to Sydney and was appointed presenter for both Nine Morning News and Nine Afternoon News whilst Amelia Adams was on maternity leave. Adams returned from maternity leave in October 2014 becoming presenter of Nine News Now, with Alison Ariotti returning to Queensland to present the news on weekends.

Personal life
Smith grew up on a cattle farm in Central Queensland.

As a Toowoomba local, Smith has said that one of the hardest stories she has covered was the Toowoomba floods. Speaking about the experience, she said: "You write and speak from a different perspective when the story is so personal. I know the experience made me a better journalist".

In 2010, Smith married her partner Mark Cameron in Toowoomba during the city's annual Carnival of Flowers festival.

In May 2016, Smith gave birth to a daughter.

References

External links 
 Davina Smith – 9 News Presenter
 Davina Smith – Twitter
 Davina Smith – Instagram

Living people
1982 births
Nine News presenters
Australian women television presenters